Danesfahan (also Romanized as Dānesfahān; also known as Dānesfān and Danīsfahān) is a city and capital of Ramand District, in Buin Zahra County, Qazvin Province, Iran. At the 2006 census, its population was 8,687, in 2,141 families. 

Danesfahan lies several kilometres west of Sagezabad and several kilometres south of Esfarvarin. Historically it has been affected by earthquakes.

People of Danesfahan are Tat and they speak the Tati language.

References 

Buin Zahra County
Cities in Qazvin Province